Bailya parva is a species of sea snail, a marine gastropod mollusc in the family Pisaniidae.

Description

Distribution
Found under rocks at 5-10 feet depth, Berry Islands, Bahamas.

References

Pisaniidae
Gastropods described in 1850
Taxa named by Charles Baker Adams